Leaf-tailed gecko may refer any of the below:
 Any of 14 species of geckos in the genus Uroplatus found in Madagascar
 Any of 9 species of geckos in the genus Phyllurus in Australia
 Any of 7 species of geckos in the genus Saltuarius found in Australia
 Long-necked northern leaf-tailed gecko, Orraya occultus in Australia

Animal common name disambiguation pages